Kuttavum Shikshayum is a 1976 Indian Malayalam-language film,  directed by M. Masthan and produced by K. S. R. Moorthy. The film stars Kamal Haasan, Sridevi, Bahadoor and K. P. Ummer. The film has musical score by M. S. Viswanathan. It was a remake of the 1973 Tamil film Pennai Nambungal.

Cast 

Kamal Haasan
Sridevi
Bahadoor
K. P. Ummer
M. G. Soman
Rajakokila
Vidhubala
Sukumari

Soundtrack 
The music was composed by M. S. Viswanathan and the lyrics were written by Mankombu Gopalakrishnan.

References

External links 
 

1976 films
1970s Malayalam-language films
Films scored by M. S. Viswanathan
Malayalam remakes of Tamil films